Murry Bowden (born December 11, 1949) is former American football player.  He was elected to the College Football Hall of Fame in 2003. He earned the National Football Foundation Outstanding Contribution to Amateur Football Award in 2018 for his contributions to the construction and management of the Atlanta College Football Hall of Fame.

Bowden graduated cum laude from Dartmouth College with a degree in psychology, and from the University of Texas at Austin school of law. After graduating from Texas, he went on to found the Hanover Company, a real estate investment group.

Notes 

1949 births
Dartmouth Big Green football players
College Football Hall of Fame inductees
Living people